Schönfeld may refer to:

Places

Germany
Schönfeld, Brandenburg, in the district Uckermark, Brandenburg
Schönfeld, Lübbenau, a quarter of Lübbenau, Brandenburg
Schönfeld, Mecklenburg-Vorpommern, in the district of Demmin, Mecklenburg-Vorpommern
Schönfeld, Saxony, in the district Riesa-Großenhain, Saxony
Schönfeld, Saxony-Anhalt, in the district of Stendal, Saxony-Anhalt

Poland
Gliśnica, Greater Poland Voivodeship, in western Poland was temporarily called Schönfeld during the German occupation from 1939-1945.

Czech Republic
Schönfeld, former name of Krásno, a town in Sokolov District

Russia
Schönfeld, former name of Yablonovka, a rural locality in Saratov Oblast

People with the surname
Johann Heinrich Schönfeld (1609–1684), German painter
Eduard Schönfeld (1828–1891), German astronomer
Heinrich Schönfeld (1900–?), Austrian footballer
Lajos Schönfeld (1901–1924), Hungarian footballer
Solomon Schonfeld (1912–1984), British rabbi and Holocaust hero
Avi Schönfeld (born 1947), Dutch-Israeli composer and pianist

Other
Schönfeld (crater), a lunar crater

See also
Schonfeld
Schönefeld